Henry Alfred Grigg (30 March 1899 – 11 July 1977) was an Australian rules footballer who played with St Kilda in the Victorian Football League (VFL).

Notes

External links 

1899 births
1977 deaths
Australian rules footballers from Melbourne
St Kilda Football Club players
People from Armadale, Victoria